Luvubu and Letaba Water Management Area in South Africa includes major South African rivers. The area is also known as "Levubu and Letaba Water Management Area (coded: 2)" and "Luvuvhu and Groot Letaba WMA". The WMA includes the following rivers: Mutale River, Luvuvhu River and Letaba River, and covers these dams:

 Albasini Dam, Luvuvhu River 
 Dap Naudé Dam, Broederstroom River 
 Ebenezer Dam, Letsitele River  
 Hans Merensky Dam, Ramadipa River 
 Magoebaskloof Dam, Politsi River 
 Middle Letaba Dam, Middle Letaba River  
 Nandoni Dam, Levhuvhu River 
 Nsami Dam, Nsama River  
 Tzaneen Dam, Groot Letaba River 
 Vergelegen Dam, Politsi tributary 
 Vondo Dam, Mutshindudi River

Boundaries 
Tertiary drainage regions A91, A92, B81 to B83 and B90.

See also 
 Water Management Areas
 List of reservoirs and dams in South Africa
 List of rivers of South Africa
 List of Water Management Areas

References

External links 
 Hydrological Services - Surface Water (Data, Dams, Floods and Flows)

Water Management Areas